Rodger Lawson is an English-American. He previously held high level positions at Prudential Financial, Van Eck Global and Fidelity Investments.

Education and career
Lawson returned to Fidelity in August 2007 on the eve of one of  worst Financial meltdowns. Chairman Edward "Ned" C. Johnson 3rd has been credited for bringing Lawson back to steer Fidelity through financial crisis. Lawson's management style and several of his key hires have increased Fidelity's profile as one of the most trusted and sound financial firms.

Lawson retired from Fidelity Investments in early 2010. He was appointed to the UnitedHealth Group Board of Directors on February 10, 2011, and the E*Trade Board of Directors on February 10, 2012.

References

American chief executives
British chief executives
American financial businesspeople
Living people
Year of birth missing (living people)